Mark Sakamoto is a Canadian lawyer and writer. He is most noted for Forgiveness: A Gift from My Grandparents, a family memoir which was published in 2014.

Originally from Medicine Hat, Alberta, he is the son of a Japanese Canadian father, Stan Sakamoto, and a Scottish-Canadian mother, Diane MacLean. He studied political science at the University of Calgary before moving to Halifax to study law at Dalhousie University. Sakamoto worked on the political staff of former Liberal Party of Canada leader Michael Ignatieff. He is currently the executive vice-president for Think Research,  a Canadian software company innovating in health data, and has served on the boards of the Ontario Media Development Corporation and the Trudeau Centre for Peace and Conflict Studies.

During World War II, his paternal grandparents were affected by the Japanese internment in Canada, while his maternal grandfather was captured by the Japanese as a prisoner of war. Their stories of struggle and hardship formed the basis of his book Forgiveness: A Gift from My Grandparents. To write the book, Sakamoto interviewed his grandparents about how they forgave those formative experiences to embrace and connect with each other when their son and daughter fell in love and married. The book was a shortlisted finalist for the Edna Staebler Award in 2015.

Forgiveness was selected for the 2018 edition of Canada Reads, where it was defended by Jeanne Beker. It ended up winning the contest on March 29, 2018. Following its Canada Reads win, producer Don Carmody announced that he had optioned the book for development as a television miniseries.

In 2020 he created and hosted the documentary series Good People for CBC Gem.

References

External links

21st-century Canadian non-fiction writers
1977 births
Canadian male non-fiction writers
Canadian memoirists
Canadian people of Japanese descent
Canadian people of Scottish descent
Canadian writers of Asian descent
People from Medicine Hat
Writers from Alberta
Living people
21st-century memoirists
Canadian television hosts
Canadian television producers